The 44th Filmfare Awards were held on 21 February 1999, in Mumbai, India.

Karan Johar's directorial debut Kuch Kuch Hota Hai led the ceremony with 18 nominations and 8 wins – including a sweep of the major acting categories, a record it held till Gully Boy (2019).

Mani Ratnam's Dil Se.. and Ram Gopal Varma's Satya were the other big winners, with 6 awards each.

Kajol received triple nominations for Best Actress for her performances in Dushman, Kuch Kuch Hota Hai and Pyaar To Hona Hi Tha, winning for Kuch Kuch Hota Hai.

Awards
The winners and nominees have been listed below. Winners are listed first, highlighted in boldface, and indicated with a double dagger.

Popular Awards

Technical Awards

Special Awards

Critics' awards

Best Film
 Satya

Best Actor
 Manoj Bajpai – Satya

Best Actress
 Shefali Shah – Satya

Biggest winners
Kuch Kuch Hota Hai – 8/18
Satya – 6/12
Dil Se.. – 6/10

References

External links
 https://www.imdb.com/event/ev0000245/1999/

See also
43rd Filmfare Awards
Filmfare Awards

Filmfare Awards
Filmfare